Forkhead box protein K2 is a protein that in humans is encoded by the FOXK2 gene.

The protein encoded by this gene contains a fork head DNA binding domain. This protein can bind to the purine-rich motifs of the HIV long terminal repeat (LTR), and to the similar purine-rich motif in the interleukin 2 (IL2) promoter. It may be involved in the regulation of viral and cellular promoter elements.

References

Further reading

External links 
 
 

Forkhead transcription factors